Ivana Lončarek (born 8 April 1991) is a Croatian athlete specialising in the sprint hurdles.

She has personal bests of 13.09 seconds in the 100 metres hurdles (-0.3 m/s, Pitesti 2016) and 8.22 seconds in the 60 metres hurdles (Gothenburg 2013).

International competitions

References

1991 births
Living people
Croatian female hurdlers
Athletes (track and field) at the 2018 Mediterranean Games
Athletes (track and field) at the 2022 Mediterranean Games
Competitors at the 2015 Summer Universiade
Competitors at the 2017 Summer Universiade
Mediterranean Games competitors for Croatia
20th-century Croatian women
21st-century Croatian women